This is a list of shipwrecks located off the coast of North Carolina.

References

Sources

External links 
 NOAA Wrecks and Obstructions Database

North Carolina
 
Shipwrecks
Shipwrecks